The Room of Tears (Italian: Sala de Lacrima), also called The Crying Room, is a small antechamber within The Sistine Chapel in Vatican City, where a newly elected pope changes into his papal cassock for the first time.

Sistine Chapel
The Room of Tears receives its name, as a reference to tears that have been shed by newly elected popes within it. According to Fr. Christopher Whitehead, the room's name can be explained “because the poor man obviously breaks down at being elected.” It is alternatively referred to as The Crying Room.

The room is located in Vatican City, to the left of the altar of the Sistine Chapel, and contains three different sizes of papal outfits (large, medium, and small), for the new pontiff to choose from and initially dress in. It also contains seven piled white shoe boxes, which are assumed to contain various sizes of the papal shoes. Additionally, the room holds albs, chasubles, and copes worn by various Popes across the years, including the cope of Pope Pius VI and the stole of Pope Pius VII.

History
Pope Leo XIII is said to have cried upon his election in 1878. After the 1958 papal conclave elected Pope John XXIII, he looked at himself in the mirror, wearing the papal cassock. Due to his large frame, it did not properly fit the pontiff, leading him to jokingly remark that “This man will be a disaster on television!”. After the 2005 papal conclave, Pope Benedict XVI is said to have entered the room looking upset, but emerged in a brighter mood.

In other media 
 The room makes an appearance in the 2019 film The Two Popes, depicting a fictional moment where Pope Benedict XVI and Pope Francis share a pizza.

See also
Index of Vatican City–related articles

References

Sistine Chapel